Dante Huckaby (born March 17, 2003) is an American soccer player who plays for college team Louisville Cardinals.

Career 
Huckaby appeared as an amateur player for USL Championship side Bethlehem Steel during their 2019 season, as well as being part of the Philadelphia Union academy. The following season, he earned a starting role at center-back alongside Ben Ofeimu.

References

External links 
 

2003 births
Living people
American soccer players
Association football midfielders
Philadelphia Union II players
Soccer players from Pennsylvania
USL Championship players